List of people who plan to be or have been cryopreserved after legal death.

Living people who plan to be cryopreserved 
Nick Bostrom
Aubrey de Grey
Robin Hanson
Ray Kurzweil
Seth MacFarlane
Ralph Merkle
Max More
David Pearce
Anders Sandberg
Peter Thiel
Edward O. Thorp
Eliezer Yudkowsky
Noel Santos Jr.

Deceased people who have been cryopreserved 

James Bedford, 1967

Dick Clair, 1988
Peter Eckersley, 2022
Robert Ettinger, 2011
FM-2030, 2000
L. Stephen Coles, 2014
 Hal Finney, 2014
John Henry Williams, 2004
Ted Williams, 2002

References 

cryonics